Hans Vonk may refer to:
Hans Vonk (conductor), Dutch conductor
Hans Vonk (cyclist), Dutch cyclist
Hans Vonk (footballer), South African football (soccer) player of Dutch descent